This article serves as an index – as complete as possible – of all the honorific orders or similar decorations awarded by Japan, classified by Monarchies chapter and Republics chapter, and, under each chapter, recipients' countries and the detailed list of recipients.

Awards

MONARCHIES

Japanese Imperial Family 

 Emperor Naruhito: 
 Collar and Grand Cordon of the Order of the Chrysanthemum
 Grand Cordon of the Order of the Paulownia Flowers 
 Grand Cordon of the Order of the Sacred Treasure
 Order of Culture
 The Golden Medal of Merit of the Japanese Red Cross
 The Golden Medal of Honorary Member of the Japanese Red Cross
 Empress Masako : 
 Grand Mistress and Grand Cordon of the Order of the Precious Crown
 The Golden Medal of Merit of the Japanese Red Cross
 The Golden Medal of Honorary Member of the Japanese Red Cross

 Emperor Emeritus Akihito : 
 Collar and Grand Cordon of the Supreme Order of the Chrysanthemum
 Grand Cordon of The Order of the Rising Sun with the Paulownia Blossoms 
 renamed Grand Cordon of The Order of the Paulownia Flowers from 2003
 Grand Cordon of the Order of the Sacred Treasure
 Order of Culture
 The Golden Medal of Merit of the Japanese Red Cross
 The Golden Medal of Honorary Member of the Japanese Red Cross
 Empress Emerita Michiko : Grand Cordon of the Order of the Precious Crown
 Prince Akishino (Fumihito) : Grand Cordon of the Order of the Chrysanthemum
 Princess Akishino (Kiko) : Grand Cordon of the Order of the Precious Crown
 Prince Hitachi (Masahito) : Grand Cordon of the Order of the Chrysanthemum
 Princess Hitachi (Hanako): Grand Cordon of the Order of the Precious Crown
 Princess Mikasa (Yuriko) : Grand Cordon of the Order of the Precious Crown
 Princess Tomohito of Mikasa (Nobuko) : Grand Cordon of the Order of the Precious Crown
 Princess Akiko of Mikasa (Tomohito's daughter) : Grand Cordon of the Order of the Precious Crown
 Princess Yōko of Mikasa (Tomohito's daughter) : Grand Cordon of the Order of the Precious Crown
 Princess Takamado (Hisako) : Grand Cordon of the Order of the Precious Crown
 Princess Tsuguko of Takamado (Takamado's daughter) : Grand Cordon of the Order of the Precious Crown

Former members 

 Atsuko Ikeda (Akihito's sister) : Grand Cordon of the Order of the Precious Crown
 Takako Shimazu (Akihito's sister) : Grand Cordon of the Order of the Precious Crown
 Yasuko Konoe (Mikasa's daughter) : Grand Cordon of the Order of the Precious Crown
 Masako Sen (Mikasa's daughter) : Grand Cordon of the Order of the Precious Crown
 Sayako Kuroda (Akihito's daughter) : Grand Cordon of the Order of the Precious Crown
 Noriko Senge (Takamado's daughter) : Grand Cordon of the Order of the Precious Crown
 Ayako Moriya (Takamado's daughter) : Grand Cordon of the Order of the Precious Crown
 Mako Komuro ( Fumihito’s daughter) : Grand Cordon of the Order of the Precious Crown

European monarchies

British Royal Family 

 Queen Elizabeth The Queen Mother : 193730 March 2002 - Grand Cordon of the Order of the Precious Crown
 Queen Elizabeth II :
 19622022 -Collar of the Order of the Chrysanthemum
 19752022 - The Golden Medal of Merit of Japanese Red Cross
 19752022 - The Golden Medal of Hononary Member of Japanese Red Cross
 The King : : 1971 – - Grand Cordon of the Order of the Chrysanthemum
 The Princess Royal : 1971: Grand Cordon of the Order of the Precious Crown

Norwegian Royal Family 
See also decorations pages (mark °) : Harald, Sonja, Haakon, Mette-Marit, Mârtha Louise, Astrid & Ragnhild

 Harald V of Norway: Grand Cordon with Collar of the Order of the Chrysanthemum °
 Queen Sonja of Norway: Grand Cordon of the Order of the Precious Crown ° 
 Haakon, Crown Prince of Norway: Grand Cordon of the Order of the Chrysanthemum ° 
 Mette-Marit, Crown Princess of Norway: Grand Cordon of the Order of the Precious Crown °

Swedish Royal Family 

 Carl XVI Gustaf of Sweden : Collar of the Order of the Chrysanthemum
 Queen Silvia of Sweden : Grand Cordon of the Order of the Precious Crown 
 Victoria, Crown Princess of Sweden : Grand Cordon of the Order of the Chrysanthemum
 Princess Désirée, Baroness Silfverschiöld : Grand Cordon of the Order of the Precious Crown (2000) 
 Princess Christina, Mrs. Magnuson : Grand Cordon of the Order of the Precious Crown (2000)

Danish Royal Family 

 Margrethe II of Denmark : Collar of the Order of the Chrysanthemum - Order of the Precious Crown, 1st Class
 Frederik, Crown Prince of Denmark : Grand Cordon of the Order of the Chrysanthemum
 Prince Joachim of Denmark : Grand Cordon of the Order of the Chrysanthemum

Dutch Royal Family 

 King Willem-Alexander of the Netherlands : Grand Cordon of the Order of the Chrysanthemum
 Princess Beatrix of the Netherlands : Collar of the Order of the Chrysanthemum
 Princess Margriet of the Netherlands : Grand Cordon of the Order of the Precious Crown
 Pieter van Vollenhoven : Grand Cordon with Collar of the Order of the Sacred Treasure

Belgian Royal Family 
 King Philippe : Grand Cordon of the Order of the Chrysanthemum (1994) 
 King Albert II : Collar of the Order of the Chrysanthemum
 Queen Paola : Dame 1st class of the Order of the Precious Crown

Spanish Royal Family 

 Juan Carlos I of Spain : Collar of the Order of the Chrysanthemum
 Queen Sofía of Spain : Grand Cordon (or 1st Class) of the Order of the Precious Crown
 Infanta Elena, Duchess of Lugo (1994) : Grand Cordon (or 1st Class) of the Order of the Precious Crown
 Infanta Cristina, Duchess of Palma de Mallorca (1994) : Grand Cordon (or 1st Class) of the Order of the Precious Crown

Asian monarchies

Jordanian Royal Family 
 Abdullah II of Jordan : Grand Cross (11.1993) then Collar (30.11.1999) of the Order of the Chrysanthemum 
 Queen Rania of Jordan : Grand Cordon of the Order of the Precious Crown (30.11.1999) 
 Princess Alia bint Al Hussein, daughter of Queen Dina of Jordan, half-sister of Abdullah II of Jordan : Grand Cordon of the Order of the Precious Crown (3.1976) 
 Princess Aisha bint Al Hussein, daughter of Princess Muna of Jordan, Abdullah II's full sister and Princess Zein's twin  : Grand Cordon of the Order of the Precious Crown (30.11.1999) 
 Prince Ali Bin Al-Hussein, son of Queen Alia of Jordan, half-brother of Abdullah II of Jordan : Order of the Rising Sun
 Prince Muhammad bin Talal, eldest younger brother of King Hussein I of Jordan : Grand Cordon of the Order of the Rising Sun (11.1978) 
 Prince Hassan bin Talal, youngest brother of King Hussein I of Jordan : Grand Cordon of the Order of the Chrysanthemum (6.1970) 
 Princess Sarvath El Hassan, Hassan's wife : Grand Cordon of the Order of the Precious Crown of Japan (04.1988) 
 Basma bint Talal, sister of  King Hussein I of Jordan : Grand Cordon of the Order of the Precious Crown (3.1976)

Thai Royal Family 

 King Maha Vajiralongkorn of Thailand : Grand Cordon of the Supreme Order of the Chrysanthemum
 Queen Sirikit of Thailand : Grand Cordon of the Order of the Precious Crown (1963)
 Princess Sirindhorn of Thailand : Grand Cordon of the Order of the Precious Crown (1991)
 Princess Chulabhorn Walailak of Thailand : Grand Cordon of the Order of the Precious Crown (1991)

Malaysian Yang di-Pertuan Agongs & Royal Families

Kedah Royal Family 

They have been awarded:

 Sultanah Haminah of Kedah: Grand Cordon of the Order of the Precious Crown (2013)

Perak Royal Family 

They have been awarded:

 Sultanah Bainun : Grand Cordon of the Order of the Precious Crown (30.9.1991)

Perlis Royal Family 

They have been awarded:

 Sultan Sirajuddin of Perlis (as Yang di-Pertuan Agong of Malaysia, 12/2001–12/2006) :
 Collar of the Order of the Chrysanthemum (7.3.2005)
 Grand Cordon (or First class) of the Order of the Sacred Treasure (22.2.1970)
 Tuanku Fauziah (Sultan Sirajuddin of Perlis's wife) :
 Grand Cordon of the Order of the Precious Crown (7.3.2005)
 Gold and Silver Star (or Second class) of the Order of the Sacred Treasure (22.2.1970)

See also 
 Mirror page : List of honours of the Japanese Imperial Family by country

Notes

References 

 
Japan